Jeremiah Brown (born 25 November 1985) is one of few Olympians ever to go from complete beginner to Olympic medalist in less than four years. Brown won an Olympic silver medal at the 2012 London Olympics as part of the men's eights for Canada. Brown became leader of the Canadian Olympic Committee's athlete wellness and transition programs for four years before becoming an author and keynote speaker on transformation, perseverance, and resilience.

Career
Originally playing as an offensive lineman in college football for the McMaster Marauders in Hamilton, Brown decided to move to British Columbia to begin his transition to rowing after watching the Canadian men's eights win gold at the 2008 Summer Olympics in Beijing. He started a learn-to-row program with the Canadian national program and spent 1,700 hours in training to learn the sport. In his competitive career he won a silver medal at the 2010 nationals as a singles sculler and he next achieved success when he won a bronze at the 2011 World Rowing Championships.

Brown won a silver medal at the 2012 Summer Olympics in the men's eight with Andrew Byrnes, Gabriel Bergen, Will Crothers, Douglas Csima, Robert Gibson, Malcolm Howard, Conlin McCabe and Brian Price. The Canadian eights had performed poorly in the heats, finishing last and casting doubt on their ability to win a medal. However, in the repechage, they finished second, behind the Great Britain crew. In the A final, the Canadian boat managed to pull past Great Britain to finish in the silver medal position - behind the German boat, who were the reigning three-time world champions.

Memoir 
In March 2018, Brown released a memoir called The 4 Year Olympian: From First Stroke to Olympic Medallist (Dundurn Press). The Toronto Star wrote of the book, "Tells the story of what it means to train hard, really hard, and develop the mental and physical skills needed for success."

References

External links
 

1985 births
Living people
Canadian male rowers
McMaster Marauders football players
Medalists at the 2012 Summer Olympics
Olympic rowers of Canada
Olympic medalists in rowing
Olympic silver medalists for Canada
Rowers at the 2012 Summer Olympics
Rowers from Hamilton, Ontario
World Rowing Championships medalists for Canada